Vermont Commons School is an independent college preparatory school located in South Burlington, Vermont, serving grades 6–12.

History
Vermont Commons School was founded in 1997. Its Founder and first Head of School was former Champlain College President Robert A. Skiff. During its first semester, 32 students were enrolled and the school grew steadily in size and offerings over the next ten years. In 2007, Skiff retired, and was succeeded by Peter Ross, who served as Head of School through the fall of 2008. Upon Ross's departure, Science and Math teacher Hans Manske served as Acting Head while the Board of Trustees conducted a search for new leadership. In July 2009, the Board selected Peter Gilmore as their new Head of School. Gilmore had previously served as Principal of The Friends School of Baltimore, MD and Upper School Director at Berwick Academy in South Berwick, Maine. After five years of solid growth approaching 100 students and including accreditation by the New England Association of Independent Schools (NEASC) and membership in the National Association of Independent Schools (NAIS), Gilmore left the school at the end of the 2013–14 school year, and was succeeded by Dr. Dexter Mahaffey. A journalist and educator, Mahaffey previously worked in public and private schools and taught at the university level around the United States, most recently serving as Director of Diversity and Global Studies at Kentucky Country Day School from 2007 to 2014. Dr. Mahaffey is past Vice President of the Vermont Independent Schools Association and former Chair of the Council of Independent Schools for the Vermont Agency of Education.  In the 2015-16 academic year, the school added the 6th grade to its academic program, exceeded 100 enrolled students, and began Sister School relationships with Colegio Santa Ana in Lima, Peru, and Pioneer Learning Community in Chengdu, China.  In the 2021-22 academic year the school celebrated its 25th year, and in the 2022-23 school year, Vermont Commons is in the midst of its 10-year NEASC re-accreditation process.

Organization

Mission
Scholarship. Community. Global Responsibility.

Campus
Since its founding in 1997, the campus has been located at 75 Green Mountain Drive in South Burlington in a building converted from an environmental testing and consulting firm, Aquatec. Re-purposing such a building was in keeping with the environmental stewardship mission of the school. The school purchased the building and property in the fall of 2010. Vermont Commons School underwent over $1,100,000 in renovations and expansion of the campus and facilities focusing on the arts and sciences in the summer of 2015.  A further substantial renovation and addition of classrooms, a college counseling center, and a new tutoring/counseling space was completed early in the 2019–20 school year.  In September 2020, the school acquired 55 acres in Charlotte for its Outdoor Education Center.  In late 2021, the school acquired a property adjacent to its original building in South Burlington, expanding its main campus to five acres consisting of two buildings, outdoor recreation space, a gymnasium, and woods.

Grade structure
Classes are taught by grade, with larger grades broken into smaller sections. Maximum class size is 18 students, with an average class size of 14 students.

Curriculum
Courses include Language Arts, Mathematics, Sciences, Social Studies, Fine Arts, Service Learning, and World Languages (Spanish and Chinese). The school offers advanced coursework in many subjects, including English, Biology, Environmental Science, Spanish and Chinese Language and Literature, and Calculus. The school considers its 'standard' rank classes to be on par with an Honors program in the public sector.

The school has gained recognition for its Research and Service community service program. In addition, Vermont Commons School offers 3 "Encounter Weeks" during the year. The faculty and students leave the confines of the school to dive deeply into a variety of experiences.  These can range from snow-shoeing in the Northeast Kingdom of Vermont to studying the Abrahamic religions in NYC, doing service work with Habitat for Humanity in the 9th Ward in New Orleans, studying tidal pool ecology in Acadia National Park, or exchanges with Sister Schools Colegio Santa Ana and Pioneer in China.

Accreditation
Vermont Commons School is accredited by the National Association of Independent Schools (NAIS) and the New England Association of Schools and Colleges (NEASC).  It maintains "approved school" status through the State of Vermont and has held memberships with the Association of Independent Schools of New England (AISNE) and the Vermont Independent Schools Association (VISA).

References

External links
Official school web page

Private high schools in Vermont
Private middle schools in Vermont
Buildings and structures in South Burlington, Vermont
Preparatory schools in Vermont
Schools in Chittenden County, Vermont